Alfalfa (Medicago sativa) is a perennial flowering plant and flower cultivated as a forage crop (alfalfa hay), foodstuff (alfalfa sprouts), and field nitrogen fixer in crop rotation.

Alfalfa may also refer to:

Places
 Alfalfa, Alabama, U.S.; an unincorporated community in Marengo County
 Alfalfa, Louisiana, U.S.; an unincorporated community in Rapides Parish
 Alfalfa, Oklahoma, U.S.; an unincorporated community in Caddo County
 Alfalfa, Oregon, U.S.; an unincorporated community in Central Oregon
 Alfalfa County, Oklahoma, U.S.
 Alfalfa, Washington State, U.S.
 Alfalfa, Seville, Seville, Andalusia, Spain; a neighbourhood

People and fictional characters
 Farmer Alfalfa, an animated cartoon character
 Alfalfa, a character in the Our Gang series played by actor Carl Switzer (1927–1959)

Other uses
 ALFALFA, a radio astronomy survey carried out by the Arecibo dish
 Alfalfa House, Enmore, Sydney, Australia; a food co-op
 Alfalfa Club, a social club
 "Alfalfa" (song), a 2009 song by 'Masters of Reality' off the album Pine Cross Dover

See also

 William H. "Alfalfa Bill" Murray (1869–1956) U.S. politician
 Alfalfa Center, Missouri, U.S.; an unincorporated community in Mississippi County